
Ribchester Bridge is a toll-free, three-span bridge over the River Ribble near Ribchester, Lancashire, England. A Grade II listed structure, located about three quarters of a mile east of the village, it actually crosses the river between the civil parishes of Clayton-le-Dale and Dutton. The bridge carries the two-lane traffic of the B6245 Ribchester Road.

Thought to have been constructed in 1774, it is built of sandstone and consists of three segmental arches on triangular cutwaters, with a string course and a solid parapet.

It has been an important crossing for millennia with the Roman fort here positioned to guard it; however, the origin of the earliest bridge is uncertain. The current bridge's predecessor had been constructed in 1669. William Stukeley in his 'Itinerarium Curiosum', published in 1721, described it as "a noble bridge of four very large arches" half a mile above Ribchester. The county authorities must have been aware of problems, as in 1769 tenders were invited for its reconstruction, but it collapsed during a flood in 1772.

That bridge had also replaced another of unknown age. A charter of 1354 gave permission for the building of a bridge of wood or stone across the river at a place called 'Madynford', also granting some land for the use of the ferryman; however, this was possibly considerably downstream, near Osbaldeston Hall, where a ferry-crossing was still recorded in the mid-19th century.

See also
 Listed buildings in Clayton-le-Dale
 Listed buildings in Dutton, Lancashire

References

Citations

Sources

External links

View from the western side of the bridge – Google Street View, July 2016

Grade II listed buildings in Lancashire
Bridges across the River Ribble
Stone bridges in England
Road bridges in England
Grade II listed bridges
Bridges completed in 1774
1774 establishments in England
Buildings and structures in Ribble Valley